"Don't Worry" is a song by Canadian music duo Appleton, taken from their debut album, Everything's Eventual. Produced by Craigie Dodds, it was released as the album's second single on 10 February 2003. The song peaked at number five in the UK Singles Chart on its first week of release before dropping out of the top 10.

Music video
The "Don't Worry" video is shot with Natalie and Nicole Appleton playing with a magic chair which can bend a long way without falling. Near the end of the video Natalie appears to have Nicole Appleton in a head lock.

Usage in media
"Don't Worry" was used from 2003 onwards as the music for the Galaxy chocolate bar advertisements.

Track listings
UK maxi-single
"Don't Worry" (radio edit) – 4:16
"Don't Worry" (Angry Mexican DJs Retronic edit) – 5:21
"Don't Worry" (Lucien Foort vocal edit) - 4:59
"Don't Worry" (King Britt vocal edit) - 5:10

UK enhanced single
"Don't Worry" (radio edit)– 4:16
"Sugarman" – 3:56
"Open to Suggestion" – 3:46
"Don't Worry" (music video)

Charts

Weekly charts

Year-end charts

See also
Appleton discography

References

2003 singles
Appleton (music duo) songs
2003 songs
Polydor Records singles